The Firth of Thames Fault is a postulated minor hinge fault along the western side of the still tectonically active Hauraki Rift which could have a length up to  and fairly likely . The recently identified but yet to be fully characterised 25km long Te Puninga fault is presumably an intra-rift fault within a few kilometres of its line. Up to the discovery of the Te Puninga fault the active displacement of the rift was believed to be accommodated by the active intra-rift Kerepehi Fault.

Geology
The fault is necessary to explain that the basement Jurassic metagreywackes that underlay the Hauraki Plains and Firth of Thames also
Upper Tertiary eruptive rocks, the Kiwitahi Volcanics, are also present on the western side as isolated extrusive bodies which line the western boundary of the Hauraki depression. The possibility that it is a rift edge fault for only part of its length and intra-rift for others arises as it was long ago noted that the Waikato River exits the Taupo Rift in a garben that could align with a wider Hauraki Rift at its southern end than the southern aspects of the fault line predicts.

References

Seismic faults of New Zealand
Thames-Coromandel District
Firth of Thames
Hauraki District